Grant Golding (born 30 March 1981) is a Canadian male artistic gymnast, representing his nation at international competitions.  He participated at the 2004 Summer Olympics and 2008 Summer Olympics. He also competed at world championships, including the 2007 World Artistic Gymnastics Championships in Stuttgart, Germany.

References

1981 births
Living people
Canadian male artistic gymnasts
Place of birth missing (living people)
Gymnasts at the 2004 Summer Olympics
Gymnasts at the 2008 Summer Olympics
Olympic gymnasts of Canada
Gymnasts at the 1998 Commonwealth Games
Gymnasts at the 2002 Commonwealth Games
Gymnasts at the 2006 Commonwealth Games
Gymnasts at the 1999 Pan American Games
Commonwealth Games medallists in gymnastics
Commonwealth Games gold medallists for Canada
Commonwealth Games silver medallists for Canada
Commonwealth Games bronze medallists for Canada
Pan American Games medalists in gymnastics
Pan American Games bronze medalists for Canada
20th-century Canadian people
21st-century Canadian people
Medallists at the 2006 Commonwealth Games
Medallists at the 1998 Commonwealth Games
Medallists at the 2002 Commonwealth Games